The 1989 Long Beach State 49ers football team represented California State University, Long Beach during the 1989 NCAA Division I-A football season.

Cal State Long Beach competed in the Big West Conference. The team was led by third-year head coach Larry Reisbig, and played home games at Veterans Stadium on the campus of Long Beach City College in Long Beach, California. They finished the season with a record of four wins and eight losses (4–8, 2–5 Big West). The 49ers offense scored 246 points while the defense allowed 407 points.

Schedule

Notes

References

Long Beach State
Long Beach State 49ers football seasons
Long Beach State 49ers football